Więcławice Dworskie  is a village in the administrative district of Gmina Michałowice, within Kraków County, Lesser Poland Voivodeship, in southern Poland.

References

See also
 Lesser Polish Way

Villages in Kraków County